The EU is the European Union, a political and economic union of 27 member states that are primarily located in Europe.

EU, Eu or eu may also refer to:

Arts and entertainment
 Entropia Universe, a virtual universe
 EU (band), a Russian electronic band
 Europa Universalis, a computer game series
 E.U. (TV series), a Hong Kong television show
 Experience Unlimited, an American go-go band
 Star Wars Expanded Universe
E:U, rapper and member of South Korean girl group Everglow

Businesses and organizations
 Ecuatoriana de Aviación (IATA code), national airline of Ecuador
 Ephraim Union, a regional political party in the Indian state of Mizoram
 European Union (resistance group), in Germany during World War II
 Sydney University Evangelical Union, a large Christian student group

Universities and colleges
 Edinburgh University, Scotland
 Ehime University, Matsuyama, Ehime, Japan
 Eastern University (United States), Pennsylvania
 Elon University, North Carolina, US
 Elmhurst University, Elmhurst, Illinois, US
 Emory University, Atlanta, US

Language
 Eu (digraph)
 Basque language (ISO 639 alpha-2 language code)

Places
 Europa Island (FIPS PUB 10-4 territory code)
 Eu, Seine-Maritime, a town in France, site of the Château d'Eu

Science and technology
 .eu, a country code top-level domain for the European Union
 Europa Universalis, a strategy video game
 Endotoxin unit, a measure of endotoxin levels
 Entropy unit, a non-S.I. unit of entropy that is equal to one calorie per Kelvin 
 Europinidin, an anthocyanidin
 Europium (symbol Eu), a chemical element
 Execution unit, a part of a CPU
 "eu" (meaning "good" or "well" in Ancient Greek), often used as a prefix in scientific terms, particularly in taxonomy

Other uses
 Emergency Unit, of the Hong Kong Police Force

See also
Europe, a continent
Euro (EUR), a currency
United States (French: États-Unis, Spanish: Estados Unidos)
Euro (disambiguation)
Europe (disambiguation)